Francis Ford Coppola (born April 7, 1939)  is an American film director, producer, screenwriter and film composer whose career spans more than fifty years. Coppola has directed twenty-two feature films to date.

His films The Godfather, The Godfather Part II, and Apocalypse Now are often cited among the greatest films ever made.

Film

Writer only

Producer only

Other roles

Recurring collaborators
Throughout his career, Coppola has repeatedly cast certain actors for his film projects. Singer-songwriter Tom Waits has appeared in six of his films, Robert Duvall has appeared in five, and Laurence Fishburne, James Caan, Diane Lane, Frederic Forrest and Glenn Withrow have all appeared in four.

Television

Producer only

See also 
 List of awards and nominations received by Francis Ford Coppola
 Distant Vision

References 

Filmography
Coppola, Francis Ford
Coppola, Francis Ford